Dwight Allen "Ike" Kelley (born July 14, 1944) is a former American football linebacker who played five seasons with the Philadelphia Eagles of the National Football League (NFL).  He was drafted by the Philadelphia Eagles in the 17th round of the 1966 NFL Draft.  He played college football at Ohio State University and attended Bremen High School in Bremen, Ohio.

College career
Kelley played football for the Ohio State Buckeyes. He was a two time All-American and All-Big Ten selection in 1964 and 1965. He was also a captain on the 1965 Ohio State Buckeyes football team.

Professional career

Philadelphia Eagles
Kelley was drafted by the Philadelphia Eagles with the 249th pick in the 1966 NFL Draft. He played in 67 games with the Eagles from 1966 to 1971. He was released by the Eagles in 1973.

References

External links
Just Sports Stats
Fanbase profile

Living people
1944 births
Players of American football from Michigan
American football linebackers
Ohio State Buckeyes football players
Philadelphia Eagles players
People from Ludington, Michigan